Manjinder Virk is a British actress, director and writer. She has appeared in the television series Holby City (1999), Doctors (2000), The Bill (2004), The Ghost Squad (2005), Runaway (2009), Skins (2010), Monroe (2011), Hunted (2012) and Midsomer Murders (2016 –2018).

She has also written and directed the short films Forgive (2008) and Out of Darkness (2013), the latter of which she won Best of Fest award at the Aesthetica Short Film Festival.

Early life
Virk was born in Coventry, England. Her mother's name is Jasvir. She comes from a family of three children.

She began acting at the Belgrade Youth Theatre in Coventry and went on to become artistic director of Pangram Dance Theatre with her brother, Hardish. She went on to earn a degree in contemporary dance at De Montfort University in Leicester.

Career
In 1999, Virk started off on the British TV series Holby City, which was just the beginning of her television career. She later appeared in three separate episodes of the TV soap opera Doctors, first in 2000 as Karen Slater, again in 2004 as Laila Khalid and in 2007 playing Harpit Jindal. She played Nasima Wahid in 2007's Britz and portrayed Lorraine Dunbar in the 2010 documentary The Arbor. For the latter, she earned three nominations: Best Newcomer at the BFI London Film Festival Awards and Best Actress and Newcomer at the BIFA Awards. She also had a small recurring role on the British medical drama show Monroe, recently appeared on the new BBC One show Hunted and has a recurring role on Midsomer Murders.

In 2003, she wrote a play for a show for touring company Theatre Centre titled Glow. In 2008, Virk wrote and directed the short film Forgive starring Sacha Dhawan and Abdi Gouhad. In 2012, she wrote and directed another short called Out of Darkness starring Tom Hiddleston, Monica Dolan, Andrew Gower, Jimmy Akingbola, Christine Bottomley and Riz Ahmed.

In 2022 she appeared as DI Samira Desai in the thriller series Trigger Point alongside Vicky McClure

Personal life
She met husband Neil Biswas on the set of the TV drama Bradford riots in 2007. As of 2013, she and her husband live in Brixton, South London.

Filmography

Awards and nominations
Virk was nominated in 2010 for Best Newcomer at the BFI London Film Festival Awards and Best Actress and Newcomer at the BIFA Awards, both for her role in The Arbor. She was one of the UK Stars of Tomorrow in Screen International in 2007. She was also nominated for Asian Woman of Achievement Award in 2008.

In 2013, for her short film Out of Darkness, Virk won Best of Fest award at the Aesthetica Short Film Festival.

References

External links

Living people
Alumni of De Montfort University
English people of Indian descent
English Sikhs
English television actresses
English film actresses
British actresses of Indian descent
Year of birth missing (living people)